Udaybhansinhji Regional Institute of Cooperative Management (URICM) is one of the five Regional Institutes of Co-operative Management in the country. It is situated at Sector-30 Gandhinagar in Gujarat.

History
It was established in 1956 and is named after Udaybhansinhji, a leader of cooperative movement and the founder Chairman of Indian Farmers Fertiliser Cooperative (IFFCO). Institute was founded in 1956 at Bhavnagar and later shifted to its present location in Gandhinagar.

Current Status & Courses
It is administered by the National Council for Cooperative training, training wing of National Co-operative Union of India (NCUI), New Delhi. The institute trains cadres to serve as professional managers to hold key position in ever growing numbers of cooperatives in India.

It provides following courses:-

Diploma in Sales & Marketing Management

Post Graduate Diploma In Management ( Agri. Business)
The course is 2 Year Post Graduate Diploma In Management (Agri. Business).

Barefoot Technician
The Course is 3 months for barefoot

Higher Diploma in Cooperative Management
The course is 6 months Higher Diploma in Cooperative Management.

References

Universities and colleges in Gujarat
Educational institutions established in 1956
1956 establishments in Bombay State
Organisations based in Gujarat